39 Boötis is a triple star system located around 224 light years away from the Sun in the northern constellation of Boötes. It is visible to the naked eye as a faint, yellow-white hued star with a combined apparent magnitude of 5.68. The system is moving closer to the Earth with a heliocentric radial velocity of −31 km/s.

It has a combined stellar classification of F8V, matching an F-type main-sequence star, with individual massed of 1.29 and 1.05 times the mass of the Sun. Component B is of magnitude 6.72 with a class of F7V and 1.25 solar masses.

References

F-type main-sequence stars
Spectroscopic binaries
Triple star systems
Boötes
Durchmusterung objects
Bootis, 39
131041
072524
5538